Jasurbek Ortikboev is an Uzbekistani Greco-Roman wrestler. He won one of the bronze medals in the 55 kg event at the 2022 World Wrestling Championships held in Belgrade, Serbia. He is also a two-time medalist at the Asian Wrestling Championships.

Career 

In 2020, he won the silver medal in the 55 kg event at the Asian Wrestling Championships held in New Delhi, India. In 2021, he won the gold medal in the 55 kg event at the Grand Prix Zagreb Open held in Zagreb, Croatia.

He won one of the bronze medals in his event at the 2022 Asian Wrestling Championships held in Ulaanbaatar, Mongolia. He won the silver medal in his event at the 2021 Islamic Solidarity Games held in Konya, Turkey.

Achievements

References

External links 
 

Living people
Year of birth missing (living people)
Place of birth missing (living people)
Uzbekistani male sport wrestlers
Asian Wrestling Championships medalists
World Wrestling Championships medalists
Islamic Solidarity Games medalists in wrestling
Islamic Solidarity Games competitors for Uzbekistan
21st-century Uzbekistani people